Pterolophia obovata is a species of beetle in the family Cerambycidae. It was described by Masao Hayashi in 1971. It is known from Japan.

References

obovata
Beetles described in 1971